The 1991–92 Football League season was Birmingham City Football Club's 89th season in the Football League and 3rd in the Third Division. They finished in second place in the 24-team division, so were promoted back to the second tier for the 1992–93 season. They entered the 1991–92 FA Cup in the first round proper and lost in that round to Torquay United, eliminated Exeter City and Luton Town from the League Cup before losing to Crystal Palace after two replays, and failed to progress past the preliminary round of the Associate Members' Cup.

Nigel Gleghorn was the club's top goalscorer, with 17 goals in the league, and 22 in all competitions.

After Lou Macari had quit as manager at the end of the 1990–91 season, and caretaker Bill Coldwell had persuaded all the out-of-contract players apart from Vince Overson to renew, Terry Cooper was appointed manager in August, only a week before the playing season started.

Football League Third Division

League table (part)

FA Cup

League Cup

Associate Members' Cup

Appearances and goals

Numbers in parentheses denote appearances as substitute.
Players with name struck through and marked  left the club during the playing season.
Players with names in italics and marked * were on loan from another club for the whole of their season with Birmingham.

See also
Birmingham City F.C. seasons

References
General
 
 
 Source for match dates, league positions and results: 
 Source for lineups, appearances, goalscorers and attendances: Matthews (2010), Complete Record, pp. 418–19, 481.

Specific

Birmingham City
Birmingham City F.C. seasons